Wagon Wheels are a sweet snack food sold in the United Kingdom, Commonwealth countries like Australia, Canada, New Zealand and India. They are also sold in Ireland. They consist of two biscuits that form a sandwich with a marshmallow filling with jam, and they are covered with a chocolate-flavoured coating.

Wagon Wheels were invented by William Peschardt, who sold the patent to Garry Weston, son of W. Garfield Weston. Garry Weston worked for his father's business in Australia before taking over his family's business in Sheffield, England. He placed two Marie biscuits around a marshmallow filling and covered it with chocolate. They were introduced in 1948. The name (originally "Weston Wagon Wheels") relates to the shape of the biscuits and capitalised on the Wild West, which was popular in mass media at the time.

Production and size

In Australia, Wagon Wheels are now produced by Arnott's Biscuits.  George Weston Foods Limited sold the brand to Arnott's in August 2003.

In the United Kingdom Wagon Wheels are produced and distributed by Burton's Foods who separated from the Weston family connection when they were sold out of Associated British Foods in 2000. The original factory which produced the biscuit was in Slough but during the early 1980s production was transferred to an updated and modern factory in Llantarnam in South Wales. 
Weston had been producing biscuits on the Slough site since 1934 
and the Llantarnam site since 1938.

In Canada, Wagon Wheels were originally produced by McCormick's, however they are now under the Dare Foods Limited name. They come in Original, Fudge, Choco Cherry, and Raspberry flavours.

There have been many debates amongst fans of the biscuit about its size. Wagon Wheels have supposedly shrunk in size over time, but Burton's Foods Ltd has denied this. It has been suggested that the supposed shrinkage is due to an adult's childhood memory of eating a Wagon Wheel held in a much smaller hand; this argument is perhaps moot, as it does not explain why the modern Wagon Wheel appears to be fatter than the original.  Furthermore, in Australia, Arnott's has stated that tray packs of Wagon Wheels were in fact 'Mini Wagon Wheels' and have re-released the original 48g Wagon Wheels.

The original factory in Prestonpans produced the biscuit with crinkled edges and corn cobbs rather than the updated smoother edges. This caused the overall diameter of the biscuit to shrink slightly, but not as much as fans of the biscuit believe.

Advertising and popular culture
The British comedians French and Saunders made a sketch with Jennifer Saunders dressed as a schoolgirl stuffing a Wagon Wheel into her mouth.

British comedians Hale and Pace used Wagon Wheels in their recurring "Curly & Nige" sketches, as the Curly and Nige characters won Wagon Wheels from each other by doing self-mutilating and dangerous bets.

Wagon Wheels are thrown into the audience by Berwick Kaler during the annual York Theatre Royal pantomime.

Wagon Wheels were "re-launched" in 2002.

Previous slogans for the product have been:
 "A taste for adventure."
 "If there's a bigger bite, it can't be found."
 During the 1980s the slogan in Australia was "It's more than a biscuit, it's a mighty big snack!"

The current slogan is "You've got to grin to get it in".

Wagon Wheels were chosen by Judge Paul Hollywood as the technical challenge for the first episode in series 9 of The Great British Bake Off.

Flavours
The original wagon wheel which is now called "chocolate" had a marshmallow centre and not a jam centre. 

 Original
 Jammie
 Toffee
 Double Choc
 Mint
 Orange
 Caramel
 Banoffee
 Big Country (Malted)

See also

 Chocolate-coated marshmallow treats – other similar products
 Weston family
 Choco pie – a similar Korean product
 Moon pie
 Alfajor
 Sandwich cookie
 List of chocolate-covered foods

References

External links
Australian Wagon Wheels Website
Burtons Foods Wagon Wheels Website
Dare Foods Wagon Wheels Website

Weston family
Biscuit brands
Products introduced in 1948
Chocolate-covered foods
Cookie sandwiches